The Saratoga Chalk is a geologic formation in Arkansas.  It preserves fossils dating back to the Cretaceous period, specifically ammonites.

Paleofauna

Ammonites
Baculites
B. ovatus
B. undatus
Didymoceras
D. navarroense
Gaudryceras
Hoploscaphites
H. pumilis
Jeletzkytes
J. nodosus
Lewyites
L. oronensis
Nostoceras
N. approximans
N. colubriformis
N. draconis
N. helicinum
N. hyatti
N. pauper
Pachydiscus
P. arkansanus
Pseudokossmaticeras
P. galicianum
Solenoceras

See also

 List of fossiliferous stratigraphic units in Arkansas
 Paleontology in Arkansas

References

 

Cretaceous Arkansas